Georg Daniel Teutsch (December 12, 1817, Schässburg, Austrian Empire - July 2, 1893, Hermannstadt, Austria-Hungary) was a Transylvanian historian and Lutheran (Augsburg Confession) bishop.

Biography
He was born in Schässburg, in the Grand Principality of Transylvania, Austrian Empire (now Sighișoara, Romania). He was bishop of the Transylvanian Saxons.

Publications
 History of the Transylvania Saxons (2d ed., 1874)
 Compend of the History of Transylvania
 Documents for the History of Transylvania (1857)
 The Reformation in the Transylvanian Saxon land (6th ed., 1886)
 Documentary History of the Evangelical Church in Transylvania (2 vols., 1862-1863).

Notes

References

1817 births
1893 deaths
People from Sighișoara
Transylvanian Saxon people
Members of the Austrian House of Deputies (1861–1867)
19th-century Lutheran bishops
19th-century Romanian historians